Iguratimod is an anti-inflammatory small molecule drug used for the treatment of rheumatoid arthritis, together with methotrexate in Japan and China. As of 2015 the biological target was not known, but it prevents NF-κB activation and subsequently selectively inhibits COX-2 and several inflammatory cytokines.

Adverse effects include elevated transaminases, nausea, vomiting, stomach pain; rashes, and itchiness.

It is a derivative of 7-methanesulfonylamino-6-phenoxychromones and is a chromone with two amide groups; it was first published in 2000. It was submitted for regulatory approval in Japan in 2003; the application was withdrawn in 2009, and it was resubmitted with additional data in 2011 and approved for marketing in Japan in 2012. Eisai and Toyama Chemical market it in Japan. Approval was obtained in China in 2011 by Simcere, independently of the Japanese originators.

During discovery and development it was called T-614 and it is marketed under the names Careram and Kolbet.

References

Sulfonamides
Anti-inflammatory and antirheumatic products
Chromones
Formamides